"Meant for You" is a song written by David Lasley and Roxanne Seeman and recorded by American singer Debra Laws. It was released in 1981 as the third single from Laws' Very Special album by Elektra Records. The song was produced by Hubert Laws and Ronnie Laws. “Meant For You” appears in the film Fighting Back  starring Tom Skerritt, Patti LuPone and Michael Sarrazin.

The song was originally recorded by David Lasley as a 24-track demo during writer recording sessions at A&M Recording Studios while Lasley was under contract to Almo Music. Lasley's version was subsequently released on several compilation albums.

Background

Roxanne Seeman gave Debra Laws “Meant For You” and “All The Things I Love”, both co-written with David Lasley, to try out. The demos were recorded with a full rhythm section and background vocals on a 24-track recorded at A&M Recording Studios.

"Meant For You" and “All The Things I Love” were re-recorded  at Concord Recording Center, formerly Scott/Sunstorm and ABC Recording Studios before that, by engineer Gerry Brown. It was produced by Hubert Laws and Ronnie Laws, using a similar arrangement to the demos.

Composition
Seeman developed the lyrical content for the song in a writing session with Lasley in his writer room at the Almo Publishing offices in Hollywood. Lasley then sat at the piano with the lyrics, where he put melody to the words and they developed it into a song.

Personnel 
David Lasley version

 David Lasley – lead vocals, background vocals, producer, arranger
 Roxanne Seeman – composer
 David Benoit – keyboards, producer
 Bobby Ray Watson – bass
 Marty Walsh – guitar
 Gary Ferguson – drums

Debra Laws version

 Debra Laws – vocals
 Hubert Laws – producer
 Ronnie Laws – producer
 Nathan East – bass
 Bobby Lyle – piano
 Roland Bautista – guitar
 Leon "Ndugu" Chancler – drums
 David Lasley – background vocals
 Arnold McCuller – background vocals
 Marlena Jeter – background vocals
 Gwen Gwenchee Mathews – background vocals
 Gerry Brown – engineer

Chart performance

"Meant For You" peaked at 47 on the Billboard US R&B chart, Hot Soul Singles, staying on the chart for 9 weeks. The accompanying Very Special album sold more than 385,000 copies worldwide.

Critical reception

“Meant For You” was a recommended pick in Billboard (magazine)’s R&B single reviews in the September 5, 1981 issue.

Track listing

A. Meant For You –⁠ 3:59
		
B. How Long –⁠ 4:02

Film

“Meant For You” appears in the 1982 film Fighting Back, directed by Lewis Teague, starring Tom Skerritt, Patti LuPone and Michael Sarrazin.

Compilations and other versions
"Meant For You" was included in a 2005 Warner Special Marketing CD compilation, Natural High 4, of soul songs from the vaults of Atlantic Records, Elektra Records and Warner Bros. Records from 1975 – 1983.  Tracks included featured Ben E. King, Aretha Franklin, Staple (band), Chaka Khan, The Meters, Michael Franks (musician), Sérgio Mendes & Brasil '77, and others.

Hal Leonard Corporation printed the single sheet piano music.

The song was released on several compilation albums featuring David Lasley as the artist:

 "Expectations of Love", Expansion Records (2001)
 "Demos" (2003)
 "Now And Again", Noa Noa Music (2006).

Reference

Songs written by Roxanne Seeman
Songs written by David Lasley
1981 songs
1981 singles
Elektra Records singles
Warner Records singles
Soul ballads
Rhythm and blues ballads
1980s ballads